Gopinathpur is a census town in Purbasthali I CD Block in Kalna subdivision of Purba Bardhaman district in the Indian state of West Bengal.

Geography

Location

Gopinathpur is located between the Bhagirathi, Ajay and Damodar rivers.

Urbanisation
87.00% of the population of Kalna subdivision live in the rural areas. Only 13.00% of the population live in the urban areas. The map alongside presents some of the notable locations in the subdivision. All places marked in the map are linked in the larger full screen map.

Demographics
As per the 2011 Census of India Gopinathpur had a total population of 4,688, of which 2,498 (53%) were males and 2,190 (47%) were females. Population below 6 years was 398. The total number of literates in Gopinathpur was 3,616 (84.29% of the population over 6 years).

 India census, Gopinathpur had a population of 4,983. Males constitute 53% of the population and females 47%. Gopinathpur has an average literacy rate of 68%, higher than the national average of 59.5%: male literacy is 74%, and female literacy is 62%. In Gopinathpur, 12% of the population is under 6 years of age.

Infrastructure
It had  of roads. It had 2 medicine shops. Amongst the educational facilities it had was 2 primary schools.

Transport
Gopinathpur is on State Highway 6. Samudragarh railway station is located nearby.

Education
Gopinathpur has two primary schools.

References

Cities and towns in Purba Bardhaman district